Eagle City is a small rural community located along and west of State Highway 58 in western Blaine County, Oklahoma, United States. Established on the Frisco Line before statehood, the post office was named Dillon. The Dillon Post Office opened July 26, 1902. The name was changed to Eagle City September 4, 1909. The ZIP Code is 73658. Google Maps scooted by the outskirts along Highway 58, but did not bother mapping the community proper.

Demographics

References

Sources
Shirk, George H. Oklahoma Place Names. Norman: University of Oklahoma Press, 1965.

External links
 Eagle City at GhostTowns.com

Unincorporated communities in Blaine County, Oklahoma
Unincorporated communities in Oklahoma